Phillip Borsos (May 5, 1953 – February 2, 1995) was an Australian-born Canadian film director, producer, and screenwriter. A four-time Canadian Film Award and Genie Award winner and an Academy Award nominee, he was one of the major figures of Canadian and British Columbian filmmaking during the 1980s, earning critical acclaim and accolades at a time when Canadian filmmakers were still struggling to gain attention outside of North America.

Early life and education
Borsos was born in Hobart, Tasmania, Australia in 1953. His father was a Hungarian sculptor and his mother an English nurse. His family emigrated to Canada when he was five years old, settling in Trail, British Columbia. Borsos showed an early interest in film-making while attending high school in Maple Ridge. He acquired a 16mm Bolex camera from his father and began making short films and documentaries. After high school, he studied film at the Banff Centre School for Fine Arts and at the Vancouver School of Art, now the Emily Carr Institute of Art and Design.

Career 
His early work included several shorts notable for their cinematography and pacing. In 1976, he incorporated his own company, Mercury Pictures, to produce commercials and sponsored films. Borsos established himself as a filmmaker to watch in the 1970s with three assured short documentaries: Cooperage (1976), Spartree (1977) and Nails (1979). All three won Best Theatrical Short at the Canadian Film Awards, and Nails received a nomination for an Academy Award in the Documentary Short category.

In 1982, at the age of 27, he emerged as a major directing talent with his feature debut, The Grey Fox. It told the story of Bill Miner, Canada's first train robber, and starred Richard Farnsworth as Miner, along with Jackie Burroughs as his mistress. This dramatic, authentic dissection of the Canadian West won seven Genie Awards, including Best Picture and Best Director, as well as being nominated for two Golden Globe Awards, including Best Foreign Film. It is still regarded as one of the best films ever made in Canada.

He followed that success with the serial killer thriller The Mean Season (1985), which starred Kurt Russell and Mariel Hemingway; and the family drama One Magic Christmas (1985), starring Mary Steenburgen and Harry Dean Stanton. Production problems dogged his biopic Bethune: The Making of a Hero (1990), which starred Donald Sutherland as Dr. Norman Bethune, and took four excruciating years to make. There were delays, crew mutinies, technical disasters and endless feuds over the script. On location in remote areas of rural China, with Chinese bureaucrats as his co-producers, Borsos was pushed to his limit. In the end, the producers froze him out of the final editing process and finished the film without him. Regardless, it received critical accolades, and earned him a Genie Award nomination for Best Director.

His final film, Far from Home: The Adventures of Yellow Dog, was shot on and around his summer home on Mayne Island. Based on his script, with characters named after his children, it was his most personal film, an adventure about a boy stranded in the woods with his dog. It was released in 1995, only a month before his passing, and was nominated for Best Family Feature at that year's Young Artist Awards.

Personal life 
Borsos was married to his wife, Beret, with whom he had two sons.

Death 
In early 1994, he was diagnosed with acute myeloblastic leukemia. He died February 2, 1995, at age 41.

Legacy
The Whistler Film Festival annually presents the Borsos Competition, a set of juried awards named in honour of Phillip Borsos, for which Canadian films screening at the festival are eligible. Borsos is considered a pioneer of the British Columbian film industry, being among the early directors to utilize and highlight its abundant and visually-stunning landscapes, and helping to establish the province's reputation as Hollywood North.

Filmography

Short films

References

External links

1953 births
1995 deaths
People from Hobart
Film producers from British Columbia
Film directors from Vancouver
Canadian people of Australian descent
Canadian people of English descent
Canadian people of Hungarian descent
Emily Carr University of Art and Design alumni
Best Director Genie and Canadian Screen Award winners